Harry Waya is a Malawian former footballer who is last known to have played as a defender.

Career

Waya made 126 appearances and scored 8 goals for Malawi.

References

External links
 

Malawian footballers
Association football defenders
Living people
Malawi international footballers
1984 African Cup of Nations players
Year of birth missing (living people)
FIFA Century Club